General Confederation of Labour can mean one of the following labor unions:

 Italian General Confederation of Labour (CGIL)
 Central General de Trabajadores (Dominican Republic), a trade union in the Dominican Republic
 Central General de Trabajadores (Honduras), a trade union in Honduras
 General Confederation of Labour of Luxembourg, a trade union federation in Luxembourg
 General Confederation of Workers (Mexico) (Confederación General de Trabajadores), a Mexican trade union
 General Confederation of Workers (Puerto Rico) (CGT)
 General Confederation of Labor (Spain), (CGT) a Spanish anarchosyndicalist trade union
 Confédération Générale du Travail, (CGT) one of the largest French confederations of trade unions
 General Confederation of Labour (Argentina), the largest labor federation in Argentina
 Confederação Geral dos Trabalhadores, a Brazilian trade union
 General Confederation of Labour (Portugal), a Portuguese trade union
 Vietnam General Confederation of Labour, a Vietnamese trade union